Lev Zakharovich Mekhlis (January 13, 1889 – February 13, 1953) was a  Soviet politician and a prominent officer in the Red Army from 1937 to 1940. As a senior political commissar, he became one of the main Stavka representatives on the  Eastern Front (1941–1945) during World War II, being involved successively with five to seven Soviet  fronts. Despite his fervent political engagement and loyalty to the Communist Party, various Soviet leaders, including Joseph Stalin, criticized and reprimanded Mekhlis for incompetent military leadership during World War II.

Early career
Mekhlis, born in Odessa, completed six classes of Jewish commercial school. He worked as a schoolteacher from 1904 to 1911. In 1907–1910 he was a member of the Zionist workers' movement Poale Zion.

In 1911 he joined the Imperial Russian Army, where he served in the second grenadier artillery brigade. In 1912 he obtained the rank of bombardier. He served in the artillery in the First World War.

In 1918, he joined the Communist Party and until 1920, he did political work in the Red Army (commissioner of brigade, then 46th division, group of forces). In 1921–1922 he managed administrative inspection in the People's Commissariat of Worker-Peasant Inspection, which was headed by Stalin. In 1922–1926 he served as the assistant to the secretary and the manager of the bureau of the Secretariat of the Central Committee - in effect Stalin's personal secretary.

In 1926–1930 he took courses at the Communist Academy and in the Institute of Red Professors. When Stalin ordered the forced collectivisation of Soviet farms in 1929, Mekhlis helped purge the Institute of Stalin's opponents. He was also the instigator of a letter published in Pravda on 30 May 1930, denouncing the influence of the right wing opposition in the Industrial Academy in Moscow. The resulting purge saw the future Soviet leader Nikita Khrushchev appointed head of the party organisation at the Academy. From 1930 he was the head of the press corps Central Committee, and in 1930, he succeeded Nikolai Bukharin, who had led the opposition to collectivisation, as editor in chief of Pravda. He was elected a candidate member of the Central Committee of the Communist Party of the Soviet Union in 1934, and promoted to full membership in October 1937.

Military career 
In December 1937, during the Great Purge, Mekhlis was confirmed as Head of the Political Administration of the Red Army, which had been vacant since the previous holder, Yan Gamarnik had committed suicide. Nicknamed "the Shark" and the "Gloomy Demon", he supervised a drastic purge of the 30,000 political commissars attached to the army, during which at least 20,000 were removed.

In May 1938, he travelled to Khabarovsk, with the Deputy head of the NKVD, Mikhail Frinovsky to supervise the purge of the Far Eastern Army, commanded by Vasily Blyukher, who was arrested and beaten to death. In a telegram to Stalin, Mekhlis boasted: "I dismissed all 215 political workers, most of them arrested. But the purge is not finished." 

In January 1938, Mekhlis was promoted to the Orgburo. By November 1938, he was officially listed as second in seniority in the military establishment, behind the People's Commissar Kliment Voroshilov, and ahead of the professional soldiers. According to Khrushchev:

From 6 September 1940-June 1941, he was People's Commissar of State Control (Goskontrolya).

During the war with Finland in 1939-40, Mekhlis was sent to the front to report personally to Stalin on why the Red Army was being beaten back by the Finns. He attributed the setbacks to treachery, and had the Soviet commander Alexei Vinogradov, his chief of staff, and the chief of the political department tried and shot in front of the troops.

In June 1941 he was reassigned to his former position as head of the chief of main political administration and the deputy of the Peoples Commissar of Defense. He was with Stalin on the day the Germans invaded the USSR, at the start of Operation Barbarossa. Mekhlis was named army commissar of the 1st rank, which corresponded to the title of General of the Red Army. In 1942 he was the representative of the Stavka, the Red Army's high command. Needing to find someone to blame for the disastrous setbacks the Red Army suffered during 1941, Mekhlis ordered that an artillery commander on the North Western front, Vasily Sofronovich Goncharov, was to be shot in front headquarters, on 11 September 1941. Goncharov was posthumously exonerated in 2002.

In March 1942, he was sent to organise the defence of the vital Kerch peninsula at the Crimean Front, where he constantly disputed with General Dmitry Timofeyevich Kozlov. In May, the Red Army was driven out of the Crimea by a smaller German force. In his report to Stalin, Mekhlis sought to blame Kozlov, but received a scathing telegram in reply:

Crimean front, t. Mekhlis:

Your code message #254 (I) received. Your position of a detached observer who is not accountable for the events at the Crimean Front is puzzling. Your position may sound convenient, but it positively stinks. At the Crimean Front, you are not an outside observer, but the responsible representative of Stavka, who is accountable for every success and failure that takes place at the Front, and who is required to correct, right there and then, any mistake made by the commanding officers.

You, along with the commanding officers, will answer for failing to reinforce the left flank of the Front. If, as you say, "everything seemed to indicate that the opponent would begin an advance first thing in the morning", and you still hadn't done everything needed to repel their attack instead limiting your involvement merely to passive criticism, then you are squarely to blame. It seems that you still have not figured out that we sent you to the Crimean Front not as a government auditor but as a responsible representative of Stavka.

You demand that Kozlov be replaced, that even Hindenburg would be an improvement. Yet you know full well that Soviet reserves do not have anyone named Hindenburg. The situation in Crimea is not difficult to grasp, and you should be able to take care of it on your own. Had you committed your front line aviation and used it against the opponent's tanks and infantry, the opponent would not have been able to break through our defenses and their tanks would not have rolled through it. You do not need to be a 'Hindenburg' to grasp such a simple thing after two months at the Crimean Front.
Stalin.

According to Alex Ryvchin " Lev Mekhlis was "a sadistic commissar…. sent to the front to have the commander and some of his staff shot before the very eyes of their men, depleting the officer ranks still further and placing greater operational command in the hands of petrified novices just as Hitler was drawing up his invasion plans."

The war correspondent, Konstantin Simonov, who witnessed the Kerch debacle, later wrote:

On his return to Moscow, Mekhlis was removed from the post of the deputy people's commissar of defense and the chief of the main political administration of the Red Army. Witnesses claim that when Mekhlis came to Stalin shortly after the defeat, Stalin shouted at him and slammed a door in his face. He was demoted in rank two levels down to a corps commissar.  

Mekhlis soon recovered from his demotion, as from December 6, 1942, he was a lieutenant general, and on July 29, 1944 he became a colonel general. On 23 June 1942 he was made head of the army's Main Political Directorate, in this position his influence was contained by resistance from leading military officers like Zhukov and Voroshilov however. In 1946 he was made minister of government control of the USSR, a position he held until 1950.

On October 27, 1950 he was discharged due to his health. He died in February 1953. His ashes were interred at the Kremlin Wall Necropolis in Red Square.

Lev Mekhlis was awarded four Orders of Lenin, five other orders and numerous medals.

Awards
 Four Orders of Lenin
 Order of the Red Banner (twice)
 Order of Suvorov
 Order of Kutuzov
 campaign and jubilee medals

Publications
The Red Army Today / Speeches Delivered [by K Voroshilov, L Mekhlis, S Budyonny, and G Stern] at the Eighteenth Congress of the CPSU(B), March 10–21, 1939, by Kliment Voroshilov,  Lev Mekhlis, Semyon Budyonny, Grigory Shtern, pub Foreign Languages Publishing House, Moscow,  1939
 The U.S.S.R. and the Capitalist Countries, edited by Lev Mekhlis, Y Varga, and Vyacheslav Karpinsky, pub Moscow, 1938, reprinted University Press of the Pacific, 2005,

References

 
 

1889 births
1953 deaths
Burials at the Kremlin Wall Necropolis
Odesa Jews
People from Odessky Uyezd
Military personnel from Odesa
Russian Jews in the military
Central Committee of the Communist Party of the Soviet Union members
Second convocation members of the Soviet of the Union
Soviet Jews in the military
Russian military personnel of World War I
Soviet military personnel of the Russian Civil War
Soviet military personnel of World War II
Recipients of the Order of Lenin
Recipients of the Virtuti Militari (1943–1989)
Politicians from Odesa
Institute of Red Professors alumni